"La Modelo" ("The Model") is a song by Ozuna and Cardi B. It was released by VP Records on December 22, 2017. The track was written by Ozuna, Cardi B, José Aponte, Vincente Saavedra and its producers Yampi, Hi Flow, Gaby Music and Chris Jeday. It is the first single from Ozuna's second album Aura, released in August 2018.

Background and composition
Ozuna told Billboard in an interview:

The song comprises a dancehall-infused beat with a "reggaetón soul." Ozuna described the song as "Jamaican dancehall, brought to the club." Cardi B performs in Spanish and English.

Critical reception
In Pitchfork,  Matthew Ismael Ruiz opined "Cardi's versatility is on full display... The tender [Ozuna]'s smoothed out alto suits Cardi's grittier voice, and they manage to capture the bubbly giddiness of fresh love with a casual swagger. Her bars in English are merely serviceable, but she sounds at home crooning in Spanish alongside Ozuna." He concluded saying "the song highlights why Cardi is so important to pop this year: Her bilingual, pan-Caribbean aesthetic represents a modern depiction of Latinidad, and proves its mainstream appeal." In 2022, Rolling Stone listed the song at number 100 on its list of the 100 Greatest Reggaeton Songs of All Time.

Music video
Directed by Nuno Gomes and filmed in Jamaica, the music video was released on December 19, 2017.

Charts

Weekly charts

Year-end charts

Release history

See also
List of Billboard number-one Latin songs of 2018

References

Las osadas

2017 singles
2017 songs
Cardi B songs
Ozuna (singer) songs
Songs written by Cardi B
Songs written by Ozuna (singer)
Songs written by Chris Jedi